Ünsal is a Turkish surname. Notable people with the surname include:

 Begünhan Elif Ünsal (born 1993), Turkish female archer
 Berk İsmail Ünsal (born 1994), Turkish footballer
 Didem Ünsal (born 1966), Turkish journalist, television presenter and author 
 Hakan Ünsal (born 1973), Turkish footballer
 Seyit Cem Unsal (born 1975), Turkish footballer
 Tuba Ünsal (born 1981), Turkish actress
 Jan Andre Ünsal (born 1996), Turkish music producer

Turkish-language surnames